The 2002 LNBP was the 3rd season of the Liga Nacional de Baloncesto Profesional, one of the professional basketball leagues of Mexico. It started on July 30, 2002 and ended on December 7, 2002. The league title was won by Correcaminos UAT Victoria, which defeated Correcaminos UAT Matamoros in the championship series, 4–3. Gallos de Pelea de Ciudad Juárez then defeated Correcaminos UAT Victoria in the Campeón de Campeones series, 4–0.

Format 
12 teams participate. The first 8 teams in the regular season standings qualify for the playoffs. The playoffs have quarterfinals (best-of-5), semifinals (best-of-7) and finals (best-of-7).

Since Gallos de Pelea de Ciudad Juárez had been absent from the playoffs due to scheduling conflicts, for this season a special additional playoff series named Campeón de Campeones (Champion of Champions) was played. After Correcaminos UAT Victoria had won the playoff final series against Correcaminos UAT Matamoros, 4–3, an additional series was played between Correcaminos UAT Victoria and Gallos de Pelea de Ciudad Juárez to name the league champion.

Teams

Regular season

Standings

Playoffs 
The playoffs were played between November 5 and December 1, 2002. After the championship finals, an additional series named Campeón de Campeones was played, ending on December 7 with the Gallos de Pelea de Ciudad Juárez defeating Correcaminos UAT Victoria, 4–0.

 Finals (best-of-7, November 23 – December 1, 2002):
 November 23: Correcaminos UAT Victoria 94, Correcaminos UAT Matamoros 83
 November 24: Correcaminos UAT Matamoros 94, Correcaminos UAT Victoria 78
 November 26: Correcaminos UAT Victoria 99, Correcaminos UAT Matamoros 90
 November 27: Correcaminos UAT Matamoros 103, Correcaminos UAT Victoria 99
 November 28: Correcaminos UAT Matamoros 85, Correcaminos UAT Matamoros 80
 November 30: Correcaminos UAT Victoria 91, Correcaminos UAT Matamoros 78
 December 1: Correcaminos UAT Victoria 81, Correcaminos UAT Matamoros 69

Correcaminos UAT Victoria wins the LNBP finals, 4–3.

 Campeón de Campeones (best-of-7):
 Game 1: Gallos de Pelea de Ciudad Juárez 108, Correcaminos UAT Victoria 79
 Game 2: Gallos de Pelea de Ciudad Juárez 101, Correcaminos UAT Victoria 98
 Game 3: Gallos de Pelea de Ciudad Juárez 88, Correcaminos UAT Victoria 83
 Game 4 (December 7): Gallos de Pelea de Ciudad Juárez 101, Correcaminos UAT Victoria 86

Gallos de Pelea de Ciudad Juárez wins the Campeón de Campeones series, 4–0.

All-Star Game 
In 2002, two All-Star Games were played. The first game was played in Monterrey on September 15 and was won by the Mexican team, 123–98. The second game was played on October 12, 2002 at the Gimnasio Olímpico Juan de la Barrera in Mexico City, and saw the Mexican win, 102–88.

Teams 
Teams for the second All-Star Game:

Mexicanos
 Víctor Buelna (Zorros de la UMSNH)
 Florentino Chávez (Correcaminos UAT Victoria)
 César Fierros (Gambusinos de Fresnillo)
 Enrique González (Gallos de Pelea de Ciudad Juárez)
 Javier González Rex (La Ola Roja del Distrito Federal)
 Omar López (Tecos de la UAG)
 Daniel Macías (La Ola Roja del Distrito Federal)
 Fernando Moreno (Tuberos de Colima)
 Anthony Norwood (Tecos de la UAG)
 Omar Quintero (Correcaminos UAT Victoria)
 Francisco Siller (Lobos de la UAdeC)
 Coaches: Jorge León Flores (Tecos de la UAG) and Raúl Palma (Gallos de Pelea de Ciudad Juárez)

Extranjeros
  Samuel Bowie (Gallos de Pelea de Ciudad Juárez)
  Gerald Burris (Tuberos de Colima)
  Nicolas Cordero (Zorros de la UMSNH)
  Lester Hood (Correcaminos UAT Matamoros)
  Michael Johnson (Correcaminos UAT Matamoros)
  Keenan Jourdon (Correcaminos UAT Victoria)
  Wilfredo Pagán (Leñadores de Durango)
  Marshall Phillips (La Ola Roja del Distrito Federal)
  Artha Reeves (Gambusinos de Fresnillo)
  Jermaine Tate (La Ola Roja del Distrito Federal)
  Todd Williams (Tecos de la UAG)
 Coaches:  Carlos Mercado (Lobos de la UAdeC) and  Marcelo Richotti (Leñadores de Durango)

References

External links 
 2002 LNBP season on Latinbasket.com

LNBP seasons
2002 in Mexican sports
2002–03 in North American basketball